César Augusto Arias Moros (born April 2, 1988), known as César Arias, is a Colombian football striker who plays for Alianza Petrolera.

Club career
César Arias began his career with Asociación Deportiva Belén before joining Alianza Petrolera in 2006. Arias was slowly integrated into the first team with Alianza but by 2008 became an integral member of the squad, and was one of the top scorers for the club in the Copa Premier II de Fútbol de Ascenso.

With Alianza Petrolera, Arias faced Cúcuta in a Copa Colombia 2008 match and impressed directors of Cúcuta who promptly signed him. He made his debut for Cúcuta during the 2009 season. In his first season with Cúcuta he appeared in 36 league matches and scored 6 goals, playing primarily as an attacking midfielder.

International career
After impressing with Cúcuta Arias was called up by Colombia in August 2010. He made his international debut for Colombia on August 11, 2010 in a 1-1 draw with Bolivia played at La Paz.

Notes

References

External links
 
 
 
 
 
 
 

1988 births
Living people
Colombian footballers
Colombia international footballers
Colombian expatriate footballers
Alianza Petrolera players
Cúcuta Deportivo footballers
Deportes Tolima footballers
Real Cartagena footballers
Once Caldas footballers
Daejeon Hana Citizen FC players
Liga FPD players
K League 1 players
Expatriate footballers in Costa Rica
Expatriate footballers in South Korea
Belén F.C. players
Categoría Primera A players
Association football forwards
Sportspeople from Santander Department